This is a list of seasons completed by the Butler Bulldogs men's basketball team of the National Collegiate Athletic Association (NCAA) Division I.

Seasons

References

Butler

Butler Bulldogs basketball seasons